Sweetheart of Sigma Chi is a 1946 American film directed by Jack Bernhard and William Beaudine.

Plot

Cast
 Phil Regan as Lucky Ryan
 Elyse Knox as Betty Allen
 Phil Brito as Phil Howard
 Ross Hunter as Ted Sloan
 Tom Harmon as Coach
 Paul Guilfoyle as Frankie
 Ann Gillis as Sue (as Anne Gillis)
 Edward Brophy as Arty
 Fred Coby as Bill Ryan (as Fred Colby)
 Alan Hale Jr. as Mike Mitchell
 David Holt as Tommy Carr
 Marjorie Hoerner as Margie
 William Beaudine Jr. as Charlie
 Emmett Vogan Jr. as Emmett
 Ruth Allen as Ruth
 Robert Arthur as Harry Townsend
 Fred Datig Jr. as Fred
 Frankie Carle : and his band
 Slim Gaillard : and his trio

References

External links
Sweetheart of Sigma Chi at IMDb
Sweetheart of Signma Chi at TCMDB

1946 films
1946 musical films
American musical films
American black-and-white films
Films directed by Jack Bernhard
1940s American films